Union Bank of Cameroon Plc. (UBC), is a commercial bank in Cameroon. It is one of the commercial banks licensed by the Central Bank of Central African States, the national banking regulator.

History
UBC was established in 1999 by a network of credit unions in Cameroon to provide retail banking services to individuals and businesses. In 2008, Oceanic Bank, a regional banking conglomerate based in Lagos, Nigeria, acquired majority shareholding in UBC, becoming the core investor.

See also

 List of banks in Cameroon
 Economy of Cameroon

References

External links
 Union Bank of Cameroon

Banks of Cameroon
Banks established in 1999
1999 establishments in Cameroon